Nandipha Mntambo (born 1982) is a South African artist who has become famous for her sculptures, videos and photographs that focus on human female body and identity by using natural, organic materials.

Life 

Nandipha Mntambo was born in Swaziland, Southern Africa, in 1982. She graduated with a master's degree in Fine Art (with distinction) from the Michaelis School of Fine Art at the University of Cape Town, in June 2007. She currently lives and works in Johannesburg, South Africa.

Work philosophy 

In her work, Mntambo focuses on the human body and the organic nature of identity, using mainly natural materials and experimenting with sculptures, videos and photography. One of her favourite materials to use in her pieces is the skin of the cow, often also used as a covering for human bodies – boneless sculptures – and thus oscillating between evoking the garments that can be shod at will and the bodies that once contained living, breathing, masticating beings with four stomachs. Mntambo embraces this ambiguity and likes to play with the tension between the sightly and the unsightly by manipulating how her viewers negotiate the two aspects of the hide. She uses her own body as the mould for these sculptures and does not intend to make an explicit statement regarding femininity. Rather, Mntambo uses these hides to explore the division between animals and humans, as well as the divide between attraction and repulsion.Through her art, Mntambo challenges traditional and nontraditional gender roles and identity, pushing the boundaries between human and animal, femininity and masculinity, attraction and repulsion, and life and death.

She states:

"My intention is to explore the physical and tactile properties of hide and aspects of control that allow or prevent me from manipulating this material in the context of the female body and contemporary art. I have used cowhide as a means to subvert expected associations with corporeal presence, femininity, sexuality and vulnerability. The work I create seeks to challenge and subvert preconceptions regarding representation of the female body."

"Themes of confrontation, protection and refuge play out particularly in relation to inner conflicts and to notions of self-love/hatred. The bronze, Sengifikile, uses my own features as a foundation, but takes on the guise of a bull. Referencing the head-and-shoulder busts of the Renaissance tradition I challenge male and female roles in society and expected associations with femininity, sexuality and vulnerability."

Exhibitions

Solo exhibitions (selection) 

 2014 Transience, Stevenson, Johannesburg 
 2013 Nandipha Mntambo, Zeitz MOCAA Pavilion, V&A Waterfront, Cape Town
 2013 Nandipha Mntambo, Andréhn-Schiptjenko, Stockholm, Sweden
 2012 Faena, Oliewenhuis Art Museum, Bloemfontein; Standard Bank Gallery, Johannesburg; University of Potchefstroom Art Gallery, Potchefstroom
 2012 The Unspoken, Stevenson, Cape Town
 2011 Faena, National Arts Festival, Grahamstown; Nelson Mandela Metropolitan Art Museum, Port Elizabeth; Iziko South African National Gallery, Cape Town
 2009 Umphatsi Wemphi, Brodie/Stevenson, Johannesburg
 2009 The Encounter, Michael Stevenson, Cape Town
 2007 Ingabisa, Michael Stevenson, Cape Town
 2007 Locating me in order to see you (Master's exhibition), Michaelis Gallery, Cape Town

Awards 

 2003/4 Mellon Meyers Fellowship, Michaelis School of Fine Art
 2005 Curatorial Fellowship, Brett Kebble Art Awards
 2010 Wits/BHP Billiton Fellowship
 2011 Standard Bank Young Artist for Visual Art
 2014 Shortlisted for the AIMIA | AGO Photography Prize (Canada)

Literature 

 Mntambo, Nandipha. Nandipha Mntambo – Locating me in order to see you. University of Cape Town, 2007.
 Mntambo, Nandipha, und Sophie Perryer. Nandipha Mntambo: Ingabisa, 16 August–15 September 2007. Michael Stevenson, 2007.
 Mntambo, Nandipha, Sophie Perryer, and Michael Stevenson Gallery. The Encounter. Michael Stevenson, 2009.

References

Further reading

External links 
 Interview with Nandipha Mntambo in Word Art
 Article on Southafrica.info
 Interview with Nandipha Mntambo in HArt

1982 births
Living people
21st-century South African women artists
21st-century South African sculptors
21st-century South African painters
21st-century women photographers
South African video artists
South African women photographers
South African photographers
South African women sculptors
South African women painters
Swazi emigrants to South Africa
Feminist artists
Michaelis School of Fine Art alumni